Craig Skinner (born 21 October 1970) is an English former professional footballer who played as a midfielder in the Football League.

Career
Skinner was born in Manchester. He made 16 appearances for Blackburn Rovers before moving to Plymouth Argyle, managed by Peter Shilton, in summer 1992.

Having made almost 100 appearances in three years for Plymouth Argyle he left the club for Wrexham for a transfer fee of £50,000. In the 1998–99 season he had injury problems.

Skinner joined York City on deadline day in March 1999 from Wrexham for a reported transfer of £30,000. He signed a three-year contract.

He suffered knee ligament damage in pre-season ahead of the 1999–2000 season and in November 1999, shortly after returning to training, he injured his knee again. He was transfer-listed in early 2000.

In the 2000–01 season Skinner turned down offers from York City to end his contract. As of April 2001, he had not made an appearance during the season and had been left out of reserve squads. He had been transfer-listed and had successfully against his dismissal at the club.

References

External links

1970 births
Living people
People from Whitefield, Greater Manchester
English footballers
Association football midfielders
English Football League players
Blackburn Rovers F.C. players
Plymouth Argyle F.C. players
Wrexham A.F.C. players
York City F.C. players
Leigh Genesis F.C. players
Northwich Victoria F.C. players